Brari Nambal, also known as Bab Demb, is a small freshwater lake located in Srinagar, Jammu and Kashmir, India. It is connected to the Dal lake via a channel and is therefore sometimes referred to as a lagoon of the Dal lake. 
Until the 1970s, it had a primary outflow in the form of the Mar Canal, but after the landfilling of this canal, the lake began to lose its glory. It is currently in highly deteriorated condition while efforts to revive it are on.

References 

Lakes of Jammu and Kashmir
Srinagar
Water pollution in India